North Concord/Martinez station is a Bay Area Rapid Transit (BART) station located in the Sun Terrace neighborhood of Concord, California. The station serves the northern area of Concord and nearby Martinez. It is located near State Route 4.

History 

The North Concord/Martinez station opened on December 16, 1995. It served as the terminal station of the line until December 7, 1996, when the extension over Willow Pass to Pittsburg/Bay Point station opened.

The station briefly served as the terminus again from March 16–21, 2016 (and at off-peak times until April 2) after electrical issues north of the station damaged a number of trains.

Sandwiched between low-density residential areas to the west and the Concord Naval Weapons Station to the east, the station has low ridership despite the 2003 addition of rush-hour short turn trains. , North Concord/Martinez had the third-lowest ridership in the system; only the 2014-opened Oakland International Airport station and 2018-opened Pittsburg Center station were less used. A 2018 study recommended a footbridge over the BART tracks south of the station to improve access from the adjacent neighborhood.

Bus connections 
The station is served by County Connection bus routes 17, 28, and 99X plus school route 627, all of which stop on the east side of the station.

References

External links 

BART – North Concord/Martinez

Bay Area Rapid Transit stations in Contra Costa County, California
Martinez, California
Stations on the Yellow Line (BART)
Railway stations in the United States opened in 1995
Buildings and structures in Concord, California
1995 establishments in California